The Baltimore Catholic League (BCL), locally known as the Catholic League  is a competitive basketball association composed of private Catholic high schools in the Baltimore, Maryland geographic area.

History  
This game went on to be known as one of the most remarkable and controversial games in Baltimore high school basketball history. The impetus for the creation of the BCL arrived in the off-season. The goal was to make a separate division from the Maryland Scholastic Association (MSA), which was the league for all high school athletics in the Baltimore area, public or private. The BCL created a division that was strictly for Baltimore area Catholic High Schools.

It is alleged that the Washington Catholic Athletic Conference (WCAC) was the model for the BCL. The BCL was originally composed of most of the schools in the list below, with the most recent additions being The John Carroll School in the 2010–11 season, and  Our Lady of Mount Carmel in the 2011–12 season. Archbishop Curley High School, a founding member of the league, left the BCL in 1997.

The Cardinal Gibbons School (which closed in 2010) has the most BCL championships to date. The late O. Ray Mullis, former head coach at Cardinal Gibbons, has the most all-time wins of any coach in Baltimore City history (621 wins), while  simultaneously claiming the most BCL championships (6). Other notable coaches in the league included Mark Amatucci, formerly of Calvert Hall College, who won a national championship in the early 80s, Cokey Robertson, formerly of St. Maria Goretti High School, Pat Clatchey of Mount Saint Joseph, William Wells formerly of St. Frances Academy, Jerry Savage formerly of Loyola Blakefield, and Dan Popera formerly of Archbishop Curley High School.

Scheduling 
The league works in cooperation with the Maryland Interscholastic Athletic Association (MIAA). Seven of the 8 teams participate in the MIAA A Conference, which results in each team playing each other twice, once home and once away.  St. Maria Goretti is the only member of the BCL that does not participate in the MIAA.

After the conclusion of the season, the BCL sponsors a league tournament held at Loyola College's Reitz Arena. The event usually occurs after the MIAA Conference Championship with all 8 teams of the league participating. It is a single-elimination tournament with 4 quarterfinal matchups, 2 semi-final games, and a championship game. The Junior Varsity (JV) teams also play in the tournament, but held at the home of the higher seed for each game.

BCL Game of the Week 
Beginning with the 2006–2007 season, RC Sports Productions broadcasts a Baltimore Catholic League Game of the Week on Fox 1370 Sports Radio (formerly V1370) WVIE in Pikesville, Baltimore.

Participating schools 
St. Frances Academy
Calvert Hall College High School 
Loyola Blakefield
St. Maria Goretti High School
Archbishop Spalding High School 
Mount Saint Joseph College
The John Carroll School
Our Lady of Mount Carmel High School
Former members: Towson Catholic and Cardinal Gibbons School both closed in 2009 and 2010, respectively; Archbishop Curley High School left the league in 1997.

Notable BCL alumni 
Many former BCL players later played collegiate basketball at NCAA Division I schools, with some advancing to the NBA:

Towson Catholic Owls
Donté Greene, '07 - NBA Sacramento Kings, NCAA Syracuse Orange
Carmelo Anthony, '02 - NBA New York Knicks, Denver Nuggets, NCAA Syracuse Orange via Oak Hill Academy (Virginia)
Malcolm Delaney, '07 - NCAA Virginia Tech Hokies

Calvert Hall Cardinals
Juan Dixon, '98 - NBA Toronto Raptors, Portland Trail Blazers and Washington Wizards, NCAA Maryland Terrapins
Duane Ferrell, '84 - NBA Atlanta Hawks, Indiana Pacers and Golden State Warriors, NCAA Georgia Tech Yellow Jackets
Gary Neal, '02 - NBA San Antonio Spurs, NCAA La Salle Explorers and Towson Tigers
Jack McClinton, '02 - selected by the San Antonio Spurs in the 2009 NBA Draft., NCAA Miami Hurricanes
Damion Lee, '10 - NCAA Louisville Cardinals, Drexel Dragons

Spalding Cavaliers
Rudy Gay, '04 - NBA Memphis Grizzlies, NCAA UConn Huskies
Aleksandar Pavlović, '99 - NBA Cleveland Cavaliers

Cardinal Gibbons Crusaders
Norman Black, '75 - NBA Detroit Pistons, NCAA Saint Joseph's College
Dylon Cormier, '10 - , NCAA Loyola Greyhounds
Quintin Dailey, '79 - NBA Chicago Bulls, L.A. Clippers and Seattle SuperSonics, NCAA San Francisco Dons
Steve Wojciechowski, '94 - NCAA Duke University Blue Devils, former Head Coach at Marquette University

Archbishop Curley Friars
Kwame Evans (played at Curley from 1987 to 1989) - NCAA George Washington University Colonials - made 3 trips to the NCAA Tournament ('93, '94, and '96) with a Sweet 16 appearance in 1993. Evans currently ranks fifth on GW's all-time scoring list and was inducted into the university's athletic Hall of Fame in 2014.

Goretti Gaels
Rodney Monroe, '87 - NBA Atlanta Hawks, NCAA NC State Wolfpack
Rodney Gibson, '01 - NCAA St. Francis Red Flash
Derrick Davis, '03 - NCAA South Carolina St. Bulldogs
Gene Johnson, '06 - NCAA Morgan State Bears
Kevin Breslin, '08 - Semi-Pro Washington Generals, NCAA Washington College Shoremen

Mount Saint Joseph Gaels
Torrey Butler, '99 - NCAA Coastal Carolina
Will Thomas, '04 - NCAA George Mason Patriots
Henry Sims, '08 - NBA Philadelphia 76ers, NCAA Georgetown University
Phil Booth, '14 - NCAA Villanova Wildcats
Jalen Smith, '18 - NCAA Maryland Terrapins

St. Frances Panthers
Devin Gray,  '91 - NBA Sacramento Kings, San Antonio Spurs, and Houston Rockets.  NCAA Clemson
Sean Mosley, '08 - NCAA Maryland Terrapins
Mark Karcher, '97 - NBA Philadelphia 76ers, NCAA Temple Owls
Dante Holmes, '16 - NCAA North Carolina Central University

References

External links 
MIAA SPORTS
BCL Official Site
Sportsmajors.com
Loyola Blakefield Basketball
BMore Hoops
Mid-Atlantic Hoops
Archbishop Spalding Basketball

Maryland high school sports conferences
Basketball in Maryland
Basketball leagues in the United States
High school basketball competitions in the United States
Catholic Church in Maryland
Catholic sports organizations